European Film Award for Best Costume Designer has been awarded annually by the European Film Academy. The category was first presented in 2013 with only one winner announced without nominees. From 1990 to 1992, costume designers were recognized with production designers in the Best Production Designer category, Franca Squarciapino received the award with Ezio Frigerio for Cyrano de Bergerac in 1990 while Valerie Pozzo Di Borgo won alongside Miljen Kreka Kljakovic for Delicatessen in 1991. 

Though the category was not presented prior to 2013, three costume designers received nominations for the Prix d'Excellence Award with Magdalena Biedrzycka winning the award for her work in Katyń in 2008.

Winners and nominees
The winners are in a yellow background and in bold.

2000s

2010s

2020s

References

External links
 Nominees and winners at the European Film Academy website

Best Costume Designer
Awards established in 2013
2013 establishments in Europe